The 2001 WNBA Playoffs was the postseason for the Women's National Basketball Association's 2001 season which ended with the  Western Conference champion Los Angeles Sparks beating the Eastern Conference champion Charlotte Sting, 2–0. Lisa Leslie was named the MVP of the Finals.

Format
The top 4 teams from each conference qualify for the playoffs.
All 4 teams are seeded by basis of their standings.

Road to the playoffs
Eastern Conference

Western Conference

Note:Teams with an "X" clinched playoff spots.

Playoffs

East First round
Charlotte 2, Cleveland 1
G1: CHA 53, CLE 46
G2: CLE 69, CHA 51
G3: CHA 72, CLE 64

New York 2, Miami 1
G1: NYL 62, MIA 46
G2: MIA 53, NYL 50
G3: NYL 72, MIA 61

West First round
L.A. 2, Houston 0
G1: LA 64, HOU 59
G2: LA 70, HOU 58

Sacramento 2, Utah 0
G1: SAC 89, UTA 65
G2: SAC 71, UTA 66

Eastern Conference Finals
Charlotte 2, New York 1
G1: NYL 61, CHA 57
G2: CHA 62, NYL 53
G3: CHA 48, NYL 44

Western Conference Finals
L.A. 2, Sacramento 1
G1: LA 74, SAC 73
G2: SAC 80, LA 60
G3: LA 93, SAC 62

WNBA Championship

See also
List of WNBA Champions

References

External links
Link to WNBA Playoffs series, recap, and boxscores

Playoffs
Women's National Basketball Association Playoffs